Keith Wainwright may refer to:

 Keith Wainwright (hairdresser), English hairdresser
 Keith Wainwright (cricketer), former Bermudian cricketer